The British–Polish–Ukrainian trilateral pact is an agreement between Poland, Ukraine and the United Kingdom announced in Kyiv on 17 February 2022 by Dmytro Kuleba, Minister of Foreign Affairs for Ukraine, and Liz Truss, Foreign Secretary for the United Kingdom. The pact serves to improve cyber security, increase energy security, and counter disinformation. The creation of the new London-Warsaw-Kyiv axis took place against the background of Russian military buildup before the 2022 invasion of Ukraine and the active supply of weapons by the United Kingdom and Poland to Ukraine.

Cooperation between the three countries was originally initiated by Ukraine in October 2021. The formation of an alliance was revealed on 1 February 2022. The announcement of the security pact was originally scheduled for 2 February, but it was delayed until 17 February.

This unnamed pact is a part of Ukraine's broader strategy to form small alliances: the Lublin Triangle (Ukraine–Poland–Lithuania), the Association Trio (Ukraine–Georgia–Moldova), and the Quadriga (Ukraine–Turkey).

History

Negotiations and early disclosures 
On 18 January 2022, the Polish Ministry of Foreign Affairs posted a message on Twitter, saying that the foreign ministers of Poland, Ukraine and the United Kingdom had discussed the prospect of trilateral cooperation.

On 21 January the British Foreign Secretary Liz Truss announced "new trilateral ties with Poland and Ukraine" at a speech at the Lowy Institute in Australia. It is considered that this format was discussed during the visit of President Volodymyr Zelensky to London the previous December.

According to BBC News Ukraine, the parties finalized the details of the agreement in late January 2022. It was originally planned that the agreement would be announced on 31 January, during a visit to Ukraine by Liz Truss. The announcement was however delayed because Liz Truss contracted COVID-19.

On 1 February, Boris Johnson and Mateusz Morawiecki arrived in Kyiv, where they met with Ukrainian Foreign Minister Dmytro Kuleba. On the same day, during his speech in the Verkhovna Rada of Ukraine, President of Ukraine Volodymyr Zelensky announced the creation of a new format of political cooperation in Europe — between Poland, Ukraine and the United Kingdom. At the same time, Foreign Minister Dmytro Kuleba revealed some additional details, stressing the importance of this pact for his country: 

The Prime Minister of Poland Mateusz Morawiecki stated at a briefing with the Prime Minister of Ukraine Denys Shmyhal on 1 February 2022, that the new political format between Ukraine, Poland and the United Kingdom will be cooperation to fight for security in the region. According to him, the format of political cooperation created by the Ministries of Foreign Affairs of the three countries is very important:

Ministress for Reintegration of the Temporarily Occupied Territories of Ukraine Iryna Vereshchuk believes that the alliance of Ukraine, Poland and the United Kingdom can become an important format in combating Russian aggression:

During a joint press conference with Boris Johnson, Volodymyr Zelensky stated that work on creating a pact between Ukraine, Poland and the United Kingdom had already begun. Zelensky added that he would be able to tell more about the union after the beginning of his work at the level of leaders, also saying he believed that it is a good platform for security and trade.

Announcement 
On 17 February 2022, in Kyiv, the Minister of Foreign Affairs for Ukraine Dmytro Kuleba and the Foreign Secretary for the United Kingdom Liz Truss officially announced the pact between Poland, Ukraine and the United Kingdom. According to Dmytro Kuleba, the alliance will focus on economic, trade and energy cooperation, as well as the fight against misinformation. They plan to pay special attention to supporting the Crimean Platform.

Liz Truss, in turn, said that the purpose of her visit was to express support for Ukraine from the United Kingdom, pointing to the assistance that London is already providing to Ukraine, including defence weapons, the training of 22,000 Ukrainian servicemen and 88 million pounds of aid aimed at Ukraine's energy independence:

Analysts' views 
Ambassador of Ukraine to the United Kingdom, Vadym Prystaiko, in an interview with BBC News Ukraine said that the proposed pact was "not exactly NATO for three. It is actually an attempt to find friends, partners, and assistance in this critical moment." According to Prystaiko, "Ukraine has to rely on NATO members ready to help now". He reminded that the partnership between the UK and Ukraine was growing stronger: the countries already signed the Political, Free Trade and Strategic Partnership Agreement; the UK would provide almost GBP $2 billion to Ukraine; the UK already supplied anti-tank weapons and helped the construction of ships and naval bases. Prystaiko explains Britain's motives as follows:

Expert Oleksandr Kraiev emphasised that such an alliance is part of Britain's strategy to restore influence in the world and the region after Brexit. "Of course, these are Britain's political ambitions," he said. In addition, three countries are actively opposing the Russian threat. On the other hand, Krayev said, the three countries "have questions" and some claims to Brussels - that is, to the EU. In NATO, not all countries are ready to resolutely oppose the Russian threat, so Britain continues the tactics of small alliances to work more effectively in Eastern Europe:

Serhii Herasymchuk, deputy director of the Ukrainian Prism Foreign Policy Council, explained how Poland benefits from the alliance:

He recalled that, in recent years, Warsaw has had conflicts with Brussels. And the recent resolution of the Russian-inspired conflict with migrants and aiding the escalation in Ukraine will be Poland's additional arguments in the debate with the EU leadership. According to experts, the involvement of London in the regional alliance is only the first step towards strengthening Britain in the region. And Ukraine should benefit greatly from this and help reduce the threat from Moscow.

Popular opinion

Ukraine 
According to a poll conducted by the Ukrainian sociological company Rating from 21 to 23 January 2022, Ukrainians were positive about the idea of a "Triple Alliance": 61 percent of respondents agreed with an alliance, with 21 percent against, while 12% of Ukrainians said they did not care, and 6% could not answer. Regionally, the idea of creating such an association is most supported by residents of the western and central regions, as well as Kyiv (support level from 65% to 76%). Residents of the southern regions (51% support, 31% do not support) and the eastern regions (40% support, 38% do not support) have a slightly worse attitude to this initiative. Among the supporters of political parties, outspoken opponents of such an initiative are supporters of the "Opposition Platform — For Life" (62% do not support), "Party of Shariy" (67%) and Nashi (68%). Among the voters of other parties, the number of those who support such an initiative far exceeds the number of its opponents. The greatest support for the idea of creating a military-political union of Poland, Ukraine and the United Kingdom is enjoyed by voters of the parties "European Solidarity", "Freedom" and "Strength and Honour", with all having an approval of over 80%.

See also 

 Intermarium
 Visegrád Group
 Three Seas Initiative

References

External links
 The first map of the union (twitter.com)

2022 in international relations
2022 treaties
2022 in Europe
21st-century military alliances
Military alliances
Intergovernmental organizations
European integration
International political organizations
Intermarium
Prelude to the 2022 Russian invasion of Ukraine
Poland–United Kingdom relations
Poland–Ukraine relations
Ukraine–United Kingdom relations